Wichita Trinity Academy is a private Christian K-12 school in northeast Wichita, Kansas.

History
Three businesspersons, Bill Nath, Pete Ochs, and Bob Smith, decided to establish a Christian school in Wichita. The school first opened in the fall of 1994;  of land had been donated and the staff had been hired the previous spring. Classes were initially held in Central Community Church, in rented space, since the school initially could not afford to build a permanent school building. Initially 61 students attended the school. The school later sold its initial land and bought a larger plot of land.

Its permanent $2.5 million building, which opened by 1998, was financed through donations. By 2006, the school had grown to 266 students, making it the largest non-Catholic Christian high school in the state. Another building campaign was held. Approximately $5 million was raised, and in 2008, the expansion was complete with more classrooms, an auditorium, and a second gymnasium. The school continued to grow beyond 300 students. In 2013–2014, the school celebrated its 20th anniversary by unveiling a new $3.5 million football stadium and track. A cross country track was added in 2014.

In 2016, an elementary and middle school. was added. The school opened at Eastminster Presbyterian, a nearby church. A new K-8 building was opened in January 2017, just south of the high school. Phase I of the new $5 million elementary and middle school includes 13 classrooms, a commons, music room, science room, library, kitchen and offices.

Trinity Academy is dedicated to partner with parents in providing a Christ-centered, college-preparatory education for students committed to spiritual growth and academic excellence.

Notable alumni include Ben Adler, former Kansas State football player, Morgan Burns, former-athlete-turned-minister, and Felix Johnson, comedian and sports talk radio host.

Athletics
It is a member of the Kansas State High School Activities Association, and has a history of excellence in their programs. 

1999 - 6-1A State Swimming Runner-Ups (Girls)

2000 - 6-1A State Swimming Champions (Girls)

2001 - 6-1A State Swimming Champions (Girls)

2001 - 3-1A State Tennis Singles Champion (Boys)

2001 – 4-1A State Soccer Champions (Boys)

2004 - 6-1A State Swimming Champions (Girls)

2005 - 6-1A State Swimming Runner-Ups (Girls)

2006 - 6-1A State Swimming Runner-Ups (Girls)

2006 – 3A State Soccer Runner-Ups (Boys)

2007 - 3A State Cross-Country Runner-Ups (Boys)

2007 - 3A State Baseball Runner-Ups

2007 - 3A State Golf Runner-Ups (Boys)

2007 - 6-1A State Swimming Champions (Girls)

2008 - 3A State Basketball Champions (Boys)

2010 – 4A State Soccer Champions (Boys)

2010 - 4A State Track and Field Runner-Ups

2012 – 4A State Soccer Runner-Ups (Girls)

2013 - 4A State Volleyball Runner-Ups

2014 – 4A State Soccer Champions (Girls)

2014 - 4A State Cross-Country Champions (Girls)

2016 – 4A State Soccer Runner-Ups (Girls)

2016 - 4A State Golf Champions (Girls)

2017 - 4A State Golf Runner-Ups (Boys)

2019 - 4A State Golf Champions (Boys)

2019 - 4A State Golf Champions (Individual - Boys)

2019 - 4A State Golf Champions (Individual - Girls)

2019 - 4A State Tennis Runner-Ups (Boys)

Policies
According to the Trinity Academy Statement of Faith, the school believes the following:
"Trinity believes that the above doctrinal statement comprises the essentials of the Christian faith and the basis for our unity as believers. Doctrines which are open to more than one interpretation by sincere, obedient, and loving Christians are not emphasized so that unity and peace in the fellowship of God’s people will not be disrupted. It is not the intention of the Board to cause division within the body of Christ by insisting that a student adhere to a particular interpretation of doctrines on which Christians may differ. When confronted with such subordinate doctrinal issues, students are encouraged to seek further counsel from their parents or pastor."

The school prohibits its students from having sexual activity.

In 2016 the school made students sign contracts saying that they may be expelled if they or any of their family members were revealed to be homosexual/LGBT and/or promoting homosexuality/LGBT. The administration responded saying that it would not "necessarily deny admission to a student with same sex attraction" and that it would not and has not rejected a student for having a sibling who identifies as LGBT.
The school stated that the families of the students should determine whether they can follow the school's Biblical worldview. Tom Witt of Equality Kansas criticized the policy, saying that it punishes third parties for the actions of others. The school received criticism on social media.

References

Further reading
 Statement from Trinity Academy to KSNW about the LGBT-related contract (Archive)

External links
 Trinity Academy

Christian schools in Kansas
Schools in Wichita, Kansas
Private high schools in Kansas
1994 establishments in Kansas
Educational institutions established in 1994